Xylococcus is a genus of scales and mealybugs in the family Xylococcidae. There are about six described species in Xylococcus.

Species
These six species belong to the genus Xylococcus:
 Xylococcus castanopsis Dong, 2017 (China)
 Xylococcus filiferus Löw, 1882 
 Xylococcus japonicus Oguma, 1926 (Japan, Russia)
 Xylococcus quercicola Danzig, 1980 (Russia)
 † Xylococcus grabenhorsti Koteja, 2008
 † Xylococcus kutscheri Koteja, 2008

References

Pseudococcidae